GSIS may refer to: Global Security Intelligence Services

Education                        
 German Swiss International School, Hong Kong
 German Swiss International School (Ghana)
 Good Shepherd International School, Ooty, Tamil Nadu, India
 Josef Korbel School of International Studies (formerly named Graduate School of International Studies) of the University of Denver
 Gyeonggi Suwon International School, South Korea

Other uses 
 Geoscience Information Society, United States
 Government Service Insurance System, Philippines
 GSIS Museo ng Sining, an art museum in Pasay, Philippines

See also 
 GSI (disambiguation)